Haddadus plicifer is a species of frog in the family Craugastoridae.
It is endemic to Brazil.
Its natural habitat is subtropical or tropical moist lowland forests.

References

Haddadus
Endemic fauna of Brazil
Amphibians of Brazil
Amphibians described in 1888
Taxonomy articles created by Polbot